The Tampere Workers' Theatre or the TTT-Theatre is one of the two main active theatres in Kaakinmaa, Tampere, Finland, along with the Tampere Theatre.

External links
 
 Official site

Theatres in Finland
Buildings and structures in Tampere
Tourist attractions in Tampere